Mika Köngäs (born 27 April 1993) is a Finnish badminton player. He won a bronze medal at the 2014 European Men's Team Championships.

References

External links 
 

1993 births
Living people
Finnish male badminton players
21st-century Finnish people